Frank Graham Laird (20 May 1893 – 17 September 1964) was an Australian rules footballer who played with South Melbourne in the Victorian Football League (VFL).

His twin brother Charlie Laird also played for South Melbourne.

Notes

External links 
		

1893 births
1964 deaths
Australian rules footballers from New South Wales
Sydney Swans players
Paddington Australian Football Club players